Grace Christian Academy is a private Christian school in Garapan, Saipan, Northern Mariana Islands. It serves grades Kindergarten through grade 12.

References

External links
Grace Christian Academy

Private elementary schools in the United States
Private middle schools in the United States
Private high schools in the United States
Christian schools in the Northern Mariana Islands
Schools in the Northern Mariana Islands
High schools in the Northern Mariana Islands